The Coppa dei Laghi-Trofeo Almar is a one-day cycling race held annually in Italy. It is part of the UCI Europe Tour in category 1.ncup, meaning it is part of the UCI Under 23 Nations' Cup.

Winners

References

External links

Cycle races in Italy
UCI Europe Tour races
Recurring sporting events established in 2015
2015 establishments in Italy
Sport in Veneto
Defunct cycling races in Italy
2016 disestablishments in Italy
Recurring sporting events disestablished in 2016